Fabian Lorenz Kowalik (April 22, 1908 – August 14, 1954), was a professional baseball pitcher. He played in the Major League Baseball from 1932 to 1936 for the Chicago Cubs, Chicago White Sox, Philadelphia Phillies, and Boston Bees.

Kowalik pitched for the Cubs in the 1935 World Series, despite only playing 20 regular season games. His sole appearance came in Game 2, pitching  innings and giving up one unearned run, as well as scoring a single in the 7th inning.

After getting married in February 1936, Kowalik arrived at spring training for the 1936 season out of shape. After recording an 0–2 record in six games, he was traded to the Philadelphia Phillies on May 21. His season did not improve — Kowalik posted an 1–5 record and an ERA of 5.38 in twenty-two games. Placed on waivers, Kowalik was picked up by the Boston Bees on September 6 and played his last MLB game against his old team, the Phillies, on September 27. Replacing Hal Lee in left field, Kowalik hit an RBI single in a 4–3 loss. Kowalik played in the minors from 1937 to 1940, retiring due to persistent arm injuries and lack of form.

Born in Falls City, Texas, Kowalik died in Karnes City, Texas, on August 14, 1954, aged 46.

References

External links

1908 births
1954 deaths
Major League Baseball pitchers
Baseball players from Texas
Chicago Cubs players
Chicago White Sox players
Philadelphia Phillies players
Boston Bees players
People from Karnes County, Texas
People from Karnes City, Texas